Les petites fugues is a 1979 Swiss comedy film directed by Yves Yersin. It competed in the Un Certain Regard section at the 1979 Cannes Film Festival. The film was produced by Filmkollektiv Zurich. The film was selected as the Swiss entry for the Best Foreign Language Film at the 52nd Academy Awards, but was not accepted as a nominee.

Plot
The old farm worker Pipe is old enough to retire. Even so, he cannot imagine a life without work. So he keeps on doing his job  and wonders what to do with his additional financial means. Soon a small moped comes to mind. Thus motorised he starts to explore the world around his village. One day he gets overly confident and drives under the influence of alcohol. This costs him his driver's license. But before this incident he has become the owner of a camera. Now he turns into a diligent photographer. Craving for new picture angles he even books a helicopter flight. With each little adventure he cares less for his old job until he embraces his retirement.

Cast
 Michel Robin as Pipe
 Fabienne Barraud as Josiane
 Fred Personne as John
 Dore De Rosa as Luigi
 Mista Préchac as Rose
 Laurent Sandoz as Alain
 Nicole Vautier as Marianne
 Léo Maillard as Stephane
 Pierre Bovet as the postman
 Roland Amstutz as the consultant
 Maurice Buffat as the policeman
 Yvette Théraulaz as fireman
 Joseph Leiser as the overseer at the chocolate factory
 Gerald Battiaz as the motorcyclist
 Martine Simon as Bica

See also
 List of submissions to the 52nd Academy Awards for Best Foreign Language Film
 List of Swiss submissions for the Academy Award for Best Foreign Language Film

References

External links

1979 films
1979 comedy films
Swiss comedy films
1970s French-language films
Films directed by Yves Yersin
Films about old age
French-language Swiss films